This Storm: A Novel is a 2019 historical fiction and crime fiction by American author James Ellroy. It is the second novel in Ellroy's "Second L.A. Quartet", in reference to the first "L.A. Quartet", and following the novel Perfidia. Ellroy dedicated the novel "To HELEN KNODE." The epigraph is "Blood alone moves the wheels of history. -Benito "Il Duce" Mussolini". It was released May 30, 2019, in the United Kingdom, and June 4, 2019 in the United States.

Plot
This Storm is set in Los Angeles and Mexico, starting with Kay Lake's remembrance of her past, and a bootleg radio transmission in Tijuana, Mexico by Father Charles Coughlin on December 30, 1941. Set after the events of Perfidia, the story follows the murder of two LAPD officers, an investigation into a gold heist, and an act of murderous arson. It follows the real life Elmer Jackson, as well as Dudley Smith, Joan Conville, and Hideo Ashida. Later, Kay Lake's diary entries are followed. Like Perfidia, Ellroy provided a dramatis personæ.

Reception
It was on the Los Angeles Times Best Seller List on June 23, 2019 for Hardcover Fiction at number 4 for two weeks. It has been reviewed by Marilyn Stasio of The New York Times, who said that Ellroy is "back, and his Los Angeles is darker than ever". The Guardians review read: "It's been five years since the last novel from the self-described 'Demon Dog' of American letters, but it’s worth the wait. Like all good jazzmen, Ellroy works very hard indeed to make his music flow so easily."

See also
1933 Griffith Park Fire
Fifth column
Battle of Los Angeles
Salvador Abascal

Notes and references

External links

  access date July 3, 2019
  access date July 3, 2019

2019 American novels
Novels by James Ellroy
Historical crime novels
Books with cover art by Chip Kidd
Fiction set in 1942
Fictional portrayals of the Los Angeles Police Department
Novels set in Los Angeles
Alfred A. Knopf books
Fiction set in the 1940s